Assam Province was a province of British India, created in 1912 by the partition of the Eastern Bengal and Assam Province. 
Its capital was in Shillong.

The Assam territory was first separated from Bengal in 1874 as the 'North-East Frontier'  non-regulation province. It was incorporated into the new province of Eastern Bengal and Assam in 1905 and re-established as a province in 1912.

History

In 1824, Assam was occupied by British forces following the First Anglo-Burmese War and on 24 February 1826 it was ceded to Britain by Burma under the Yandaboo Treaty of 1826. 
Between 1826 and 1832, Assam was made part of Bengal under the Bengal Presidency. From 1832 to October 1838, the Assam princely state was restored in Upper Assam while the British ruled in Lower Assam. Purandar Singha was allowed to rule as king of Upper Assam in 1833, but after that brief period Assam was annexed to Bengal by the British. In 1873, British political control was imposed on western Naga communities. On 6 February 1874, Assam, including Sylhet, was severed from Bengal to form the Assam Chief-Commissionership, also known as the 'North-East Frontier'. Shillong was chosen as the capital of the Non-Regulation Province of Assam in September 1874. The Lushai Hills were transferred to Assam in 1897. The new Commissionership included the five districts of Assam proper (Kamrup, Nagaon, Darrang, Sibsagar and Lakhimpur), Khasi-Jaintia Hills, Garo Hills, Naga Hills, Goalpara and Sylhet-Cachar comprising about 54,100 sq miles. Cooch Behar a historical part of Assam, was left out.

From 16 October 1905, Assam became part of the Province of East Bengal and Assam. The province was annulled in 1911 following a sustained mass protest campaign and on 1 April 1912 the two parts of Bengal were reunited and a new partition based on language followed, Oriya and Assamese areas were separated to form new administrative units: Bihar and Orissa Province was created to the west, and Assam Province to the east.

British India's Montagu–Chelmsford Reforms enacted through the Government of India Act 1919 expanded the Assam Legislative Council and introduced the principle of dyarchy, whereby certain responsibilities such as agriculture, health, education, and local government, were transferred to elected ministers. Some of the Indian ministers under the dyarchy scheme were Sir Syed Muhammad Saadulla (Education and Agriculture 1924–1934) and Rai Bahadur Promode Chandra Dutta (Local Self-government).

The Government of India Act 1935 provided provincial autonomy and further enlarged the elected provincial legislature to 108 elected members. In 1937, elections were held for the newly created Assam Legislative Assembly established in Shillong. The Indian National Congress had the largest number of seats, with 38 members, but declined to form a government. Therefore, the Assam Valley Party with Muslim League's support Sir Syed Muhammad Saadulla was invited to form a ministry. Saadulla's government resigned in September 1938, after the Congress changed its decision, and the Governor, Sir Robert Neil Reid, then invited Gopinath Bordoloi. Bordoloi's cabinet included the future President of India Fakhruddin Ali Ahmed.
During the Japanese invasion of India in 1944, some areas of Assam Province, including the Naga Hills district and part of the Manipur princely state, were occupied by Japanese forces between mid March and July.

When fresh elections to the provincial legislatures were called in 1946, the Congress won a majority in Assam, and Bordoloi was again the Chief Minister. Prior to the Independence of India, on 1 April 1946, Assam Province was granted self-rule and on 15 August 1947 it became part of the Dominion of India. Bordoloi continued as the Chief Minister even after India's independence in 1947.

Chief commissioners
1889 – 1891                    James Wallace Quinton          (b. 1834 – d. 1891)
1912 – 1918                Archdale Earle                     (b. 1861 – d. 1934) 
1918 –  3 January 1921         Sir Nicholas Dodd Beatson Bell     (b. 1867 – d. 1936)

Governors

 3 January 1921 –  2 April 1921  Sir Nicholas Dodd Beatson Bell     (s.a.) 
 3 April 1921 – 10 October 1922  Sir William Sinclair Marris        (b. 1873 – d. 1945) 
10 Oct 1922 – 28 June 1927  Sir John Henry Kerr                (b. 1871 – d. 1934) 
28 Jun 1927 – 11 May 1932  Sir Egbert Laurie Lucas Hammond    (b. 1873 – d. 1939) 
11 May 1932 –  4 March 1937  Sir Michael Keane                  (b. 1874 – d. 1937) 
 4 March 1937 –  4 May 1942  Robert Neil Reid                   (b. 1883 – d. 1964) 
 4 May 1942 –  4 May 1947  Sir Andrew Gourlay Clow            (b. 1890 – d. 1957)
15 Mar 1944 – Jul 1944     Mutaguchi Renya                    (b. 1888 – d. 1966)  Mil (Japanese military commander)        
16 Mar 1944 – Jul 1944     A.C. Chatterjee                                         IIL  (for the provisional government of Free India)
 4 May 1947 – 15 August 1947  Sir Saleh Hydari                   (b. 1894 – d. 1948)

Chief ministers

 1 April 1937 – 19 September 1938  Maulavi Saiyid Sir Muhammad Saadulla       (b. 1885 – d. 1955)  ML  (1st time)
19 Sep 1938 – 17 November 1939  Gopinath Bordoloi (1st time)       (b. 1890 – d. 1950)  INC
17 Nov 1939 – 24 December 1941  Maulavi Saiyid Sir Muhammad Saadulla      (s.a.)         ML (2nd time)
24 Dec 1941 – 24 August 1942  Governor's Rule 
25 Aug 1942 – 11 February 1946  Maulavi Saiyid Sir Muhammad Saadulla       (s.a.)      ML  (3rd time)
11 Feb 1946 – 15 August 1947  Gopinath Bordoloi (2nd time)       (s.a.)               INC

Deputy Commissioners of the Naga Hills District

1912–1913                J.K. Webster
1913–1917                H.C. Berners
1917–1935                John Henry Hutton                  (b. 1885 – d. 1968)        
1935–1937                James Philip Mills                 (b. 1890 – d. 1960)
1937–1947                Charles Ridley Pawsey              (b. 1894 – d. 1972)

Demographics

See also
Bengal Presidency
Colonial Assam
Northeast Frontier Railway zone
Partition of Bengal

Notes

References
 The Imperial Gazetteer of India (26 vol, 1908–31), highly detailed description of all of India in 1901. online edition

External links
Integration of the North East: the State Formation Process (archived 19 February 2014)

Provinces of British India
History of Assam
History of Manipur
History of Nagaland
Bengal Presidency
1912 establishments in British India
1947 disestablishments in British India